Teenage Kicks is an Australian drama film, directed by Craig Boreham and released in 2016. The film stars Miles Szanto as Miklós Varga, the son of Hungarian immigrants to Australia who is struggling to come to terms with his sexual attraction to his best friend Dan (Daniel Webber) in the wake of having been indirectly responsible for his older brother Tomi's (Nadim Kobeissi) accidental death.

The film's cast also includes Shari Sebbens as Annuska, Charlotte Best as Phaedra, Tony Poli and Anni Finsterer as Miklós's parents Viktor and Illona, and Ian Roberts as Dan's father Jack. The film was compared by some film critics to Head On, the 1998 film about a gay Greek Australian man.

The film premiered in June 2016 at the 2016 Sydney Film Festival.

Szanto won the award for Best Performance in a Male Role at the 2017 Iris Prize festival. Composer David Barber received an AACTA Award nomination for Best Original Music Score at the 6th AACTA Awards, and Boreham received an Australian Directors' Guild nomination for Best Direction in a Feature Film.

References

External links
 

2016 films
Australian coming-of-age drama films
Australian LGBT-related films
2016 LGBT-related films
LGBT-related drama films
LGBT-related coming-of-age films
Gay-related films
2010s English-language films
Films directed by Craig Boreham
2010s Australian films